The Catholic Church in Burkina Faso is part of the worldwide Catholic Church, under the spiritual leadership of the Pope in Rome. According to the CIA Factbook, in 2018 17 percent of the population are members of the Catholic Church.

History
The first Catholics to enter what is today Burkina Faso arrived with the French colonialists in 1896. In 1900 and 1901 Catholic missions were established at Koupéla and Ouagadougou, respectively and Joanny Thévenoud, a missionary helped to firmly establish Catholicism in the country over the following five decades. Abbé Yougbaré was consecrated as the Bishop of Koupéla on 29 February 1956 and became the first African Catholic bishop.

Persecution
There have been several incidences of persecution against the Catholic Church in Burkina Faso over the past years. Recent cases include an attack on the minor seminary of Saint Kisito de Bougui, in February, which caused no fatalities, but much material damage. In July 2022 the diocese of Fadi N'Gourma stated that only 5% of its parishes were now accessible for pastoral work, due to the increased threat of Islamist terrorists in the region. An attack in a village in the Diocese of Nouma, also in July 2022, caused at least 22 fatalities, according to official numbers, though some witnesses spoke of up to 30 killed. In an interview with Aid to the Church in Need, in August 2022, Catholic priest Honoré Quedraogo said that the attackers "force the Burkinabé to follow Sharia. Men are forced to wear trousers of adequate length, and forbidden from shaving their beards, and women have to be veiled. Western-style education is banned, and children are made to attend Koranic schools, called Madrassas. Churches must not ring their bells, and everyone is required to participate in prayers at the mosques".

In November 2022 a Burkinabé priest, Pierre Rouamba, said that he has noticed that the attacks are increasingly being directed against Christians. In some cases, terrorists not only burn down the church building, but also destroy the crosses as a demonstration of their intention to wipe out the Christian faith.

Dioceses
Archdiocese of Bobo-Dioulasso
Diocese of Banfora
Diocese of Dédougou
Diocese of Diébougou
Diocese of Gaoua
Diocese of Nouna
Archdiocese of Koupéla
Diocese of Dori
Diocese of Fada N’Gourma
Diocese of Kaya
Diocese of Tenkodogo
Archdiocese of Ouagadougou
Diocese of Koudougou
Diocese of Manga
Diocese of Ouahigouya

See also
List of cathedrals in Burkina Faso
Religion in Burkina Faso

References

 
Burkina Faso
Burkina Faso